There are several Armstrong awards, named after different people called Armstrong.

 Louis Armstrong award for musical achievement in high school
 Edwin Howard Armstrong award for excellence and originality in radio broadcasting